Ode’ Omaani Osbourne (born January 9, 1992) is a Jamaican mixed martial artist who competes in the Flyweight division of the Ultimate Fighting Championship.

Background
Growing up in Kingston, Jamaica, Osbourne lived primarily with his grandmother and then his great grandmother. His mother had him when she was 18 and still in school, and his father moved away to England when he was seven. At the age of 9, Osbourne moved to Flatbush section of Brooklyn, New York. He would bounce around after that, making a stop in Florida where he played highschool football alongside Jacoby Brissette in William T. Dwyer High School. After dropping football for wrestling, he exceled as a member of the school’s wrestling team, where he became a three time state finalist. Osbourne enrolled at Wisconsin's Carroll University, where his high school coach Ben Tomes had just accepted a position. After reaching nationals as a freshman, Osbourne hit a bump in the road, as the wrestling program was shut down the ensuing year.

Osbourne works as an assistant teacher for his full-time job.

Mixed martial arts career

Early career

Osbourne made his amateur MMA debut in 2013, originally starting his training at small gym in Waukesha, Wisc. Making his MMA debut at NAFC Explosio in 2015, he submitted Brent Lee via rear-naked choke in the second round, before defeating his next two opponents in David Rhodes and Doug Milbrath. He would then lose his first professional fight against Antonio Sanchez via unanimous decision at RFA 39, Osbourne faced Cory Galloway at Pure Fighting Championships 5, and went on to defeat him via split decision. Osbourne would lose against this time to Jose Luis Calvo via kneebar in the first minute of the bout at United Combat League: Havoc In Hammond 4. Osbourne would win his next three bouts; Seigenald Aurtan Daley Jr in the first round via triangle choke at Pure Fighting Championship 9, Daley Jr for the second time via TKO in round one at Pure FC 10, and finally Kelly Offield in round one via triangle choke at HD MMA 15.

Dana White's Contender Series
Osbourne faced Armando Villarreal on July 16, 2019, at Dana White's Contender Series 20 for a chance at a UFC contract. He won the bout after submiiting Villarreal via armbar in the first round, earning a UFC contract in the process.

Ultimate Fighting Championship

Osbourne made his UFC debut against Brian Kelleher at UFC 246 on January 18, 2020. He lost the fight via a submission in the first round.

Osbourne was expected to face Jerome Rivera at a UFC event on January 30, 2021. The event never materialized and the pairing was canceled.

Osbourne was expected to face Denys Bondar in a catchweight bout of 130 pounds on February 6, 2021, at UFC Fight Night: Overeem vs. Volkov. However, Bondar withdrew during fight week due to undisclosed reasons and was replaced by Jerome Rivera, with their bout taking place at featherweight. Osbourne won the fight via knockout out in round one.

Osbourne was expected to face Amir Albazi on July 17, 2021, at UFC on ESPN: Makhachev vs. Moisés. However, Albazi pulled out of the fight in late June citing injury. In turn, Osbourne was pulled from the card entirely and rescheduled for a future event.

Osbourne faced Manel Kape on August 7, 2021, at UFC 265. At the weigh-ins, Kape weighed in at 129 pounds, three pounds over the flyweight non-title fight limit. The bout proceeded at catchweight and Kape was fined 20% of his purse, which went to Osbourne. He lost the fight via knockout in round one.

Osbourne faced CJ Vergara on November 6, 2021, at UFC 268. At the weigh-ins, Vergara weighed in at 127.4 pounds, 1.4 pounds over the flyweight non-title fight limit. The bout proceeded at a catchweight and he forfeited 20% of his purse to Osbourne. Osbourne won the fight via unanimous decision.

Osbourne faced Zarrukh Adashev on June 4, 2022, at UFC Fight Night 207. He won the fight via knockout in the first round. This win earned him the Performance of the Night award.

Osbourne faced Tyson Nam on August 13, 2022 at UFC on ESPN 41. He lost the fight via knockout in round one.

Osbourne was scheduled to face Denys Bondar on February 25, 2023, at UFC Fight Night 220.  However, Bondar withdrew from the event for undisclosed reasons and he was replaced by Charles Johnson. Osbourne won the fight via split decision.

Championships and accomplishments
Ultimate Fighting Championship
Performance of the Night (One time)

Mixed martial arts record

|-
|Win
|align=center|12–5 (1)
|Charles Johnson
|Decision (split)
|UFC Fight Night: Muniz vs. Allen
|
|align=center|3
|align=center|5:00
|Las Vegas, Nevada, United States
|
|-
|Loss
|align=center|11–5 (1)
|Tyson Nam
|KO (punches)
|UFC on ESPN: Vera vs. Cruz
|
|align=center|1
|align=center|2:59
|San Diego, California, United States
|
|-
|Win
|align=center|11–4 (1)
|Zarrukh Adashev
|KO (punches)
|UFC Fight Night: Volkov vs. Rozenstruik
|
|align=center|1
|align=center|1:01
|Las Vegas, Nevada, United States
|
|-
|Win
|align=center|10–4 (1)
|CJ Vergara
|Decision (unanimous)
|UFC 268
|
|align=center|3
|align=center|5:00
|New York City, New York, United States
|
|-
|Loss
|align=center|9–4 (1)
|Manel Kape
|KO (flying knee and punches)
|UFC 265
|
|align=center|1
|align=center|4:44
|Las Vegas, Nevada, United States
|
|-
|Win
|align=center|9–3 (1)
|Jerome Rivera
|KO (punches)
|UFC Fight Night: Overeem vs. Volkov
|
|align=center|1
|align=center|0:26
|Las Vegas, Nevada, United States
|
|-
| Loss
|align=center|8–3 (1)
|Brian Kelleher
|Submission (guillotine choke)
|UFC 246 
|
|align=center|1
|align=center|2:49
|Las Vegas, Nevada, United States
|
|-
| Win
|align=center|8–2 (1)
| Armando Villarreal
| Submission (armbar)
|Dana White's Contender Series 20
|
|align=center|1
|align=center|4:39
|Las Vegas, Nevada, United States
|
|-
| Win
|align=center|7–2 (1)
|Kelly Offield
|Submission (triangle choke)
|HD MMA 15
|
|align=center|1
|align=center|4:07
|Shawnee, Oklahoma, United States
|
|-
| Win
|align=center|6–2 (1)
| Aurtan Daley
|TKO (punches)
|Pure FC 10
|
|align=center|1
|align=center|2:16
|Milwaukee, Wisconsin, United States
|
|-
| Win
|align=center|5–2 (1)
| Aurtan Daley
|Submission (triangle choke)	
| Pure FC 9
| 
|align=center|1
|align=center|1:44
| Milwaukee, Wisconsin, United States
|
|-
| Loss
|align=center|4–2 (1)
| Jose Luis Calvo
| Submission (kneebar)
| United Combat League: Havoc in Hammond 4
| 
|align=center| 1
|align=center| 0:24
| Hammond, Indiana, United States
| 
|-
| Win
|align=center|4–1 (1)
| Cory Galloway
| Decision (split)
| Pure FC 5
|
|align=center|3
|align=center|5:00
|Milwaukee, Wisconsin, United States
| 
|-
| Loss
|align=center|3–1 (1)
| Antonio Sanchez
| Decision (unanimous)
|RFA 39
|
|align=center|3
|align=center|5:00
|Hammond, Indiana, United States
|
|-
| Win
|align=center|3–0 (1)
| David Rhoads
| TKO (submission to punches)
|NAFC: Super Brawl
|
|align=center|1
|align=center|4:36
|Waukesha, Wisconsin, United States
| 
|-
| Win
|align=center|2–0 (1)
| Doug Milbrath
| TKO (punches)
| NAFC: Battledome
| 
|align=center|1
|align=center|1:37
| Waukesha, Wisconsin, United States
| 
|-
|NC
|align=center|1–0 (1)
| Murjan Flowers
| No Contest
| Pure FC 1
| 
|align=center|2
|align=center|0:00
| Milwaukee, Wisconsin, United States
|
|-
| Win
|align=center|1–0
| Brent Lee
| Submission (rear-naked choke)
| NAFC: Explosion
| 
|align=center|2
|align=center|1:10
| Waukesha, Wisconsin, United States
|

See also 
 List of current UFC fighters
 List of male mixed martial artists

References

External links 
  
 

1992 births
Living people
Jamaican emigrants to the United States
Jamaican male mixed martial artists
Jamaican practitioners of Brazilian jiu-jitsu
American male mixed martial artists
American practitioners of Brazilian jiu-jitsu
Featherweight mixed martial artists
Mixed martial artists utilizing kickboxing
Mixed martial artists utilizing Brazilian jiu-jitsu
Ultimate Fighting Championship male fighters
Sportspeople from Kingston, Jamaica